Bamako, Burkina Faso may refer to:

Bamako, Bougouriba
Bamako, Comoé